is a Japanese footballer. He currently plays for Ehime FC on loan from Shonan Bellmare.

Career statistics

Club
Updated to 18 January 2019.

1Includes Japanese Super Cup.

References

External links 
Profile at Shonan Bellmare 
Profile at FC Tokyo

1987 births
Living people
Association football people from Tokyo
Japanese footballers
J1 League players
J2 League players
Yokohama F. Marinos players
Ehime FC players
Shonan Bellmare players
FC Tokyo players
FC Machida Zelvia players
Association football goalkeepers